Sterling Trucks Corporation (commonly designated Sterling) was an American truck manufacturer.  Founded in 1998, Sterling was created following the 1997 acquisition of the heavy-truck product lines of Ford Motor Company by Freightliner.  Taking its nameplate from a long-defunct truck manufacturer, Sterling was slotted between Freightliner and Western Star within the Daimler product range (later Daimler Trucks North America).

Introduced as a rebadged version of Ford Louisville/Aeromax product line, the Sterling product range was expanded in the 2000s with medium-duty (Class 5–7) trucks.  After years of struggling to meet sales expectations, Daimler discontinued the Sterling Trucks line in 2009.

Headquartered in Redford Township, Michigan (Detroit), Sterling assembled its conventional-cab vehicles in St. Thomas, Ontario and Portland, Oregon.  Sterling-brand trucks were sold in the United States, Canada, Mexico, Australia, and New Zealand.

History

Sternberg/Sterling Motor Truck Company (1907–1953) 
The company was founded in 1906 by William Sternberg as the Sternberg Motor Truck Company of Milwaukee, Wisconsin. Early models offered were of cab-over design, in 1-, 1.5- 3.5- and 5-ton capacities. Sternberg changed the company name to Sterling at the onset of World War I. Sterling built many different heavy-duty trucks for commercial, construction and military customers in the ensuing years.

The company was bought by White Motor Company on June 1, 1951.  About two years later, the Sterling nameplate was retired.

Sterling trademark  
Following its last use in 1953, the trademark of Sterling would change hands several times, through White Motor Company and its successor Volvo-White Motor Company (itself becoming the North American division of Volvo Trucks).

As the Sterling trademark had become dormant for so long, when Freightliner (whose own trucks were distributed by White Motor Company from the 1950s to 1975) sought to use the name in 1997, there were no grounds for objection from Volvo.

Sterling Trucks Corporation (1997–2009) 
Sterling built Class 8 tractors, as well as a range of medium- and heavy-duty cab/chassis vehicles. With bodies added by third-party upfitters/body builders, these cab/chassis vehicles were used for freight distribution as well as heavy vocational uses, such as construction, snow plowing and refuse collection.

In the last few years of operation, the company also marketed light to medium-duty cab/chassis vehicles from corporate siblings, such as the 360 (a rebadged Mitsubishi Fuso Canter) and Bullet (a badge-engineered Dodge Ram Chassis Cab). These were typically outfitted with bodies suitable for use as lighter vocational trucks — those designed to perform jobs other than straight freight hauling — including fire trucks, garbage trucks, dump trucks, concrete mixers, tanker trucks, and snowplows.

Discontinuation 
On October 14, 2008, Daimler Trucks North America announced a plan to discontinue the Sterling product line in an effort to consolidate its North American truck manufacturing operations under the Freightliner and Western Star brands.  The company stopped taking orders for new trucks in January 2009, the St. Thomas manufacturing plant closed in March 2009, and the Portland, Oregon, plant was closed in June 2010.

Models

From 1997 to 2009, Sterling produced several lines of trucks.  Within Daimler-Benz, the Sterling product range was slotted between the Freightliner and Western Star product lines.  Through much of its existence, the Sterling product range served as continuation of the second-generation Ford Louisville/AeroMax conventional product line (introduced in 1996).  
 Sterling 360 – a rebadged Mitsubishi Fuso medium-duty cabover sold as the Fuso FE model in the U.S. and Canada and the Fuso Canter in Europe, Asia, Australia, and New Zealand
 A line – set back
 Acterra - (1999-2009) Class 5-8 medium-duty, using L-line cab with Freightliner Business Class chassis.
 Bullet – a cab/chassis model based on the third generation Dodge Ram 4500/5500 platform
 Condor - rebadged Freightliner cab. Was used commonly on garbage trucks.  
 L line – set back, set forward

See also

Freightliner Trucks
Western Star Trucks

References

External links

Sterling Trucks official website

Defunct truck manufacturers of the United States
Daimler Truck
Motor vehicle assembly plants in Canada
Vehicle manufacturing companies established in 1997
Vehicle manufacturing companies disestablished in 2008
Defunct manufacturing companies based in Detroit